William Morton Pitt, FRS (16 May 1754 – 28 February 1836) was a British Member of Parliament.

He was the eldest son of John Pitt of Encombe House, Dorset and educated at Queen's College, Oxford. He entered Lincoln's Inn to study law in 1774.

In 1780 he was returned to Parliament as the Member for Poole, which he represented until 1790 after which he represented Dorset from 1790 to 1826.

He was elected a Fellow of the Royal Society in 1787.

He died in 1836. He had married twice; firstly Margaret, the daughter of John Gambier, Governor of the Bahamas, with whom he had a daughter, and secondly Grace Amelia, the daughter of Henry Seymour of Hanford, Dorset, with whom he had 2 sons and a daughter.

References

1764 births
1836 deaths
Politicians from Dorset
Alumni of The Queen's College, Oxford
Members of Lincoln's Inn
Members of the Parliament of Great Britain for English constituencies
British MPs 1780–1784
British MPs 1784–1790
British MPs 1790–1796
British MPs 1796–1800
Members of the Parliament of the United Kingdom for English constituencies
UK MPs 1801–1802
UK MPs 1802–1806
UK MPs 1806–1807
UK MPs 1807–1812
UK MPs 1812–1818
UK MPs 1818–1820
UK MPs 1820–1826
Fellows of the Royal Society
William Morton